The table below lists the reasons delivered from the bench by the Supreme Court of Canada during 2007. The table illustrates what reasons were filed by each justice in each case, and which justices joined each reason. This list, however, does not include reasons on motions.

Reasons

See also
 2007 decisions: CanLII LexUM

References

Table key

Reasons Of The Supreme Court Of Canada, 2007
2007